Cooper Woods-Topalovic (born 7 September 2000) is an Australian freestyle skier. He competed in the 2022 Winter Olympics.

Woods broke into the World Cup top-10 in moguls on 7 January 2022, finishing ninth in Tremblant, and bested that five days later, by finishing fifth in Deer Valley, for his top result to date. He supports Brisbane Broncos and trains out of Perisher Valley, New South Wales.

References

External links

2000 births
Living people
Freestyle skiers at the 2022 Winter Olympics
Australian male freestyle skiers
Olympic freestyle skiers of Australia
Sportsmen from New South Wales
Freestyle skiers at the 2017 Asian Winter Games